Line 19 of the Shenzhen Metro is a line under planning, which will connect the districts of Longgang and Pingshan for 33 kilometers and 18 stations. Construction is planned to begin in 2023. The first phase of Line 19 has entered Phase V planning, and will run from Nantangwei to Julong in Pingshan District, with 12 stations and 12.5 kilometers of track. The line is proposed to use 6 car type B trains.

Stations (Phase 1)

References

Shenzhen Metro lines
Transport infrastructure under construction in China